Maja e Papingut is a peak of the Nemërçkë mountain ridge located in the south of Albania, near the Vjosë river. From the rocky summit there is a wonderful view of other Albanian mountains such as Tomorr and Gramos.

See also
 List of European ultra prominent peaks

References

External links
 "Nemerçka, Albania" on Peakbagger

Mountains of Albania